13th House is a 1981 album by jazz pianist McCoy Tyner released on the Milestone label. It was recorded in October 1980 and features performances by Tyner with a big band that includes alto saxophonist Joe Ford, flautist Hubert Laws, tenor saxophonist Ricky Ford, trombonist Slide Hampton, bassist Ron Carter and trumpeters Oscar Brashear and  Charles Sullivan.

Reception
The Allmusic review by Scott Yanow states "everyone wanted to play with McCoy Tyner! The powerful music lives up to its potential".

Track listing

Recorded in NYC, October, 1980

Personnel
McCoy Tyner: piano, arranger
Oscar Brashear: trumpet
Kamau Muata Adilifu: flugelhorn
Slide Hampton: trombone, arrangement
Gregory Williams: french horn
Bob Stewart: tuba
Hubert Laws: piccolo, flute
Joe Ford: alto saxophone, soprano saxophone, flute
Ricky Ford: tenor saxophone, soprano saxophone
Frank Foster: tenor saxophone, soprano saxophone, clarinet, arranger
Ron Carter: bass
Jack DeJohnette: drums
Airto Moreira: percussion
Dom Um Romao: percussion
Jimmy Heath: arranger

References

McCoy Tyner albums
1981 albums
Milestone Records albums
Albums produced by Orrin Keepnews
Albums arranged by McCoy Tyner
Albums arranged by Jimmy Heath
Albums arranged by Slide Hampton